Hammersmith and Fulham London Borough Council is the local authority for the London Borough of Hammersmith and Fulham in Greater London, England. It is a London borough council, one of 32 in the United Kingdom capital of London. Hammersmith and Fulham is divided into 21 wards, electing a total of 50 councillors. The council was created by the London Government Act 1963 as the Hammersmith London Borough Council and replaced two local authorities: Hammersmith Metropolitan Borough Council and Fulham Metropolitan Borough Council. The council was renamed on 1 January 1980.

History

There have been a number of local authorities responsible for this area. The current local authority was first elected in 1964, a year before formally coming into its powers and prior to the creation of the London Borough of Hammersmith on 1 April 1965. Hammersmith London Borough Council replaced Hammersmith Metropolitan Borough Council and Fulham Metropolitan Borough Council. Both had been created in 1900, replacing parish vestries. Fulham was an ancient parish covering broadly the same area as the current borough. Hammersmith was governed by a separate vestry from 1631 and was formally split off as a separate civil parish in 1834. They were joined for local government from 1855 to 1886 as the Fulham District of the Metropolis, governed by the Fulham District Board of Works.

It was envisaged that through the London Government Act 1963 Hammersmith and Fulham as a London local authority would share power with the Greater London Council. The split of powers and functions meant that the Greater London Council was responsible for "wide area" services such as fire, ambulance, flood prevention, and refuse disposal; with the local authorities responsible for "personal" services such as social care, libraries, cemeteries and refuse collection. The council was renamed on 1 January 1979. The two tier arrangement lasted until 1986 when Hammersmith and Fulham London Borough Council gained responsibility for some services that had been provided by the Greater London Council, such as waste disposal. Hammersmith and Fulham became an education authority in 1990. Since 2000 the Greater London Authority has taken some responsibility for highways and planning control from the council, but within the English local government system the council remains a "most purpose" authority in terms of the available range of powers and functions.

Powers and functions
The local authority derives its powers and functions from the London Government Act 1963 and subsequent legislation, and has the powers and functions of a London borough council. It sets council tax and as a billing authority also collects precepts for Greater London Authority functions and business rates. It sets planning policies which complement Greater London Authority and national policies, and decides on almost all planning applications accordingly.  It is a local education authority  and is also responsible for council housing, social services, libraries, waste collection and disposal, traffic, and most roads and environmental health.

The council was found to have exceeded its powers in a landmark English administrative law case, Hazell v Hammersmith and Fulham LBC, which declared that local authorities had no power to engage in interest rate swap agreements because they were beyond the council's borrowing powers. Their actions were held to contravene the Local Government Act 1972.

In 2021 the council was found by the Housing Ombudsman  to be the worst performing landlord in the country with regards to damp and mould in its properties.

Elections

Since 1964 political control of the council has been held by the following parties:

See also
London Plus Credit Union

References

External links 
 

Local authorities in London
London borough councils
Politics of the London Borough of Hammersmith and Fulham
Leader and cabinet executives
Local education authorities in England
Billing authorities in England